Walton Township is a township in Harvey County, Kansas, United States.  As of the 2000 census, its population was 552.

Geography

Cemeteries
According to the USGS, it contains one cemetery, Walton.

Transportation
A major highway US-50 and a railroad BNSF Railway pass through Walton Township. US-50 was originally the New Santa Fe Trail and roughly parallels the BNSF Railway.

The Amtrak Southwest Chief stops in nearby Newton twice each day and provides passenger rail service towards Los Angeles and Chicago. See Newton (Amtrak station).

References

Further reading

External links
 Harvey County Website
 City-Data.com
 Harvey County maps: Current, Historic, KDOT

Townships in Harvey County, Kansas
Townships in Kansas